NGC 2029 (also known as ESO 56-EN156 or the Dragon's Head Nebula) is an emission nebula in the Dorado constellation and is part of the Large Magellanic Cloud. It is part of a complex of nebulae and stars, including NGC 2032, NGC 2035 and NGC 2040. It was discovered by James Dunlop on the 27 September 1826. Its apparent magnitude is 12.29, and its size is 2.25 arc minutes.

The coordinates for NGC 2029 and NGC 2030 were reversed between Herschel's original Catalogue of Nebulae and Clusters of Stars and the New General Catalogue.  NGC 2030, originally GC 2029, is an isolated nebula with an embedded star cluster, about 1.5 degrees north of NGC 2029.

References

Emission nebulae
ESO objects
2029
Large Magellanic Cloud
Astronomical objects discovered in 1826
Dorado (constellation)
Discoveries by James Dunlop